Merrillville is an unincorporated community in Thomas County, in the U.S. state of Georgia.

History
A post office called Merrillville was established in 1900, and remained in operation until 1933. The Georgia General Assembly incorporated Merrillville as a town in 1902.

References

Former municipalities in Georgia (U.S. state)
Unincorporated communities in Thomas County, Georgia